Pandit Nikhil Ranjan Banerjee (14 October 1931 – 27 January 1986) was an Indian classical sitarist of the Maihar Gharana. Along with Pandit Ravi Shankar and Ustad Vilayat Khan, he emerged as one of the leading exponents of the sitar. He was a recipient of the Indian civilian honour of the Padma Bhushan.

Training

In 1947, Banerjee met Allauddin Khan, who was to become his main guru along with his son, Ali Akbar Khan. Both were sarod players. Banerjee went to Allauddin Khan's concerts and was desperate to have him as his teacher. Allauddin Khan did not want to take on more students, but changed his mind after listening to one of Banerjee's radio broadcasts. Allauddin Khan was Banerjee's main teacher and after he left Maihar he also learnt from Ali Akbar Khan, the son of Allaudin Khan, for many years.

Ustad Allauddin Khan was passing on not only playing technique but the musical knowledge and approach of the Maihar gharana (school); yet there was a definite trend in his teaching to infuse the sitar and sarod with the been-baj aesthetic of the Rudra veena, surbahar and sursringar—long, elaborate alaap (unaccompanied improvisation) built on intricate meend work (bending of the note). He was also well known for adjusting his teaching to his particular students' strengths and weaknesses. Consequently, under his teaching, Shankar and Banerjee developed different sitar styles.

Inspiration and critical acclaim

In an interview Nikhil said he had been influenced by Allauddin Khan, Ali Akbar Khan, Amir Khan, and to a lesser extent by Omkarnath Thakur, Faiyaz Khan, Kesarbai Kerkar, and Roshanara Begum.

For Banerjee, music-making was a spiritual rather than a worldly path:

Indian music is based on spiritualism; that is the first word, you must keep it in your mind. Many people misunderstand and think it's got something to do with religion—no, absolutely no! Nothing to do with religion, but spiritualism—Indian music was practised and learned to know the Supreme Truth. Mirabai, Thyagaraja from the South, Haridas Swami, Baiju—all these great composers and musicians were wandering saints; they never came into society, nor performed in society.

Nikhil Banerjee is revered for his mastery in both melodic and rhythmic aspects of Indian music. His unique style of sitar playing is considered to have completeness, emotion and depth. His interpretation of ragas was usually traditional, although he is credited with creating at least two new ragas.  His usage of a completely "bandh" or "closed" jawari in the Maihar style sitar allowed for a much greater amount of sustain (since the strings are not buzzing against the bridge as much) as can be heard in his unique sound.  Though his strings do not sound as "closed" as Ustad Vilayat Khan's sitar playing, it was only due to the technical differences in their physical sitars (and jawari was changed specifically for the Jor strings etc.) that the sitars sounded in "different" style.

According to the San Francisco Chronicle, Banerjee's "technique is a phenomenon, faster than cheetahs, more secure than the dollar." Music and Musicians observed that "his improvisations always sound completely natural and spontaneous." In an obituary the New York Times wrote "the extraordinary fluidity and assurance of his rhythmic ideas and phrasing set a standard that would have left the more international 'stars' of Indian music behind."

Partial discography

The following is a summary of some recent CD issues.
A more comprehensive discography can be found in the external links.

Afternoon Ragas (1970), released in 1992
Live: Misra Kafi (1982)
The Hundred-Minute Raga: Purabi Kalyan (live) (1982)
Immortal Sitar of Pandit Nikhil Banerjee, Ragas: Purabi Kalyan, Zila-Kafi, Kirwa (1986)
Lyrical Sitar (1991)
Live at De Kosmos: Amsterdam 1972 (1995)
The KPFA Tapes: Berkeley 1968 (1995)
Rag Hemant (1995)
Le Sitar Du Pandit (1996)
Raga Patdeep (1996)
Live in Amsterdam 1984 (1997)
Genius of Pandit Nikhil (live) (1998)
Berkeley 1968 (1998)
Live Concert, Vol. 2: India's Maestro of Melody (1999)
Pandit Nikhil Banerjee (live) (1999)
Total Absorption (2000)
Banerjee Live in Munich 1980 (2000)
Morning Ragas: Bombay Complete Concert 1965 (live) (2000)
Musician's Musician (2001)
India's Maestro of Melody: Live Concert, Vol. 5 (2002)
Alltime Classic, Vol. 1: Raag Bageshree (live) (2004)
Pratibha: Sony Music(Live) (2011)

References

Allauddin claimed he was teaching Banerjee the sitar "style of Nawab Kutubudaulla Bahadur of Lucknow", a player not otherwise remembered. (My Maestro As I Saw Him, essay by Banerjee printed in the booklet for Afternoon Ragas, Raga Records Raga-211)
San Francisco Chronicle:

Banerjee's technique is a phenomenon, faster than cheetahs, more secure than the dollar. But he does not lean on that as most players do. It is there, at the ready, a strength to be called on when needed. It is his gentle playing that is so singular. The ease of it, highlighted by atypical (for Indian music) bits of literal reiteration create a kind of euphoric effect. The result is remarkably individual. One could spot a Banerjee performance on a radio broadcast or tape, a thing of great difficulty among Oriental musicians.

 Manomanjari—a variation: some argue it's a blend of Kalavati & Marwa. In a 1979/80 [not verifiable] Calcutta concert [@Kala Mandir], as per the announcement, Mr. Banerjee played two ragas of his own creation—Manomanjari & Chandrakaushiki.

Last Concert

Further reading
 Swapan Bandyopadhyay: "The Strings Broke Long Ago", Ananda Publishers,  Kolkata

External links
Full discography - published and unpublished works, videos, interviews, biography and other links by Alan Tootill

Discogs Nikhil Banerjee
John B. Cosgrave tribute site for Nilhil Banerjee

1931 births
1986 deaths
Bengali musicians
Hindustani instrumentalists
Maihar gharana
Pupils of Allauddin Khan
Recipients of the Padma Bhushan in arts
Recipients of the Padma Shri in arts
Sitar players
Musicians from Kolkata
20th-century Indian musicians
Indian classical musicians of Bengal
Recipients of the Sangeet Natak Akademi Award